The Women's Downhill competition of the Innsbruck 1984 Paralympics.

Visually Impaired
In the downhill visually impaired, the athlete with a visual impairment has a sighted guide.

B1
 
B1 - visually impaired: no functional vision

B2

B2 - visually impaired: up to ca 3-5% functional vision

Standing

LW2

LW2 - standing: single leg amputation above the knee

LW4

LW4 - standing: single leg amputation below the knee

LW5/7

LW5/7 - standing: double arm amputation

LW6/8

LW6/8 - standing: single arm amputation

See also
Alpine skiing at the 1984 Winter Olympics – Women's downhill

References

 Winter Sport Classification, Canadian Paralympic Committee

Women's downhill
Para